Belforti is a surname. Notable people with the surname include:

José Belforti (born 1981), Argentine footballer, twin brother of Martín
Martín Belforti (born 1981), Argentine footballer

See also
Belfort (disambiguation)

Italian-language surnames